Blair Montgomery Thornton (born July 23, 1950) is a Canadian guitarist and songwriter most widely known for his work with the rock band Bachman-Turner Overdrive (BTO). He also played in the Vancouver-based band Crosstown Bus prior to joining BTO.

Biography
Thornton joined the group in early 1974 during the supporting tour for the Bachman-Turner Overdrive II album, replacing Tim Bachman shortly after that album was released. Thornton made his live debut with BTO at a March 1974 televised event for Don Kirshner's In Concert program hosted by Don E. Branker.

Thornton's first album with BTO was the highly successful Not Fragile LP, released in the fall of 1974. Upon Thornton's arrival, BTO began incorporating "dual-lead" guitar solos into many new songs, with Thornton playing the lead guitar parts along with primary lead guitarist Randy Bachman. Such solos were not a major feature on the band's first two albums. In interviews years later, Randy noted that Blair Thornton was a welcome addition:

He was known for playing in the Eric Clapton/Bluesbreakers style. [He] was more advanced on the guitar than my brother Tim, who was basically a rhythm player who left all the lead to me. I'm not that good. I would repeat myself, my vocabulary is limited and I didn't have time to go out and learn. So Blair brought in a new style. We now had twin lead guitars, and that made my job a lot easier; it gave us more versatility.

As a songwriter, Thornton contributed two compositions to the Not Fragile album: "Givin' It All Away" and an instrumental called "Freewheelin'" that also wound up as the B-side of the No. 1 hit "You Ain't Seen Nothing Yet". He also co-wrote three songs for the follow-up 1975 album, Four Wheel Drive, including the title track (with Randy Bachman), and co-wrote the Top 40 hit "Take It Like a Man" (with Fred Turner) for the late 1975 album Head On. Two other songs on Head On, "It's Over" and "Wild Spirit", also credit Thornton as a co-writer.

Following Randy Bachman's departure from the group in 1977, Thornton took over as primary lead guitarist on their next two albums: Street Action (1978) and Rock n' Roll Nights (1979), also contributing several compositions. Thornton rejoined the "classic" Not Fragile line-up (Randy Bachman, Robbie Bachman, and Fred Turner) in 1988 for a reunion tour. In 1991, Randy Bachman left the group again and this time was replaced by Vancouver guitarist-singer Randy Murray. This version of BTO proved to be the most enduring, as they toured together until the latter part of 2004.

In 2014, Thornton along with original band members Fred Turner, Robbie and Randy Bachman were inducted into the Canadian Music Hall of Fame. Thornton currently enjoys a quiet semi-retirement with his wife, Shane.

Awards and recognitions

Juno Awards

References

External links
 Website for current version of BTO

1950 births
Living people
Bachman–Turner Overdrive members
Canadian male guitarists
Canadian male singer-songwriters
Canadian singer-songwriters
Canadian male singers
Canadian rock guitarists
Canadian rock singers
Lead guitarists
Musicians from Vancouver